AI & Society is a quarterly peer-reviewed scientific journal published by Springer. The editor-in-chief is Karamjit S. Gill, Brighton University. AI & Society has been running since 1987. It covers all aspects of artificial intelligence and its effects on and interaction with society.

History 

The journal was originally conceived as a reaction to the attitude of Technological Determinism emerging from Silicon Valley and was designed to be the theoretical underpinning of the concept of Human-Centred Systems a concepted developed by Mike Cooley in his book Architect or Bee?.

The idea for the journal arose from the year-long secondment of Prof Karamjit Gill from 1985 to 1986 to work with Mike Cooley at the Greater London Enterprise Board (GLEB). During his secondment Karamjit organised a seminar “Knowledge and Society” at the MIT in Boston with Prof Joseph Weizenbaum and the resulting discussion led to Karamjit’s suggestion to develop a journal. Mike Cooley became the founding Chairman and later Patron and Prof Karamjit Gill became, and still is, the Founding Editor-in-Chief.

AI & Society is referred to as The Journal of Knowledge, Culture and Communication. The first edition was titled "AI & Society: The Journal of Human Centred Systems" and the second volume was titled "AI & Society: The Journal of Machine Intelligence".

Key people

 Editor: Karamjit S. Gill, Professor Emeritus, Human Centred Systems, University of Brighton
 Editor, North America: Victoria Vesna, Department of Design, Media Arts, University of California
 Open Forum Editor: David Smith, Emeritus Professor, University of Wales, Newport
 Review Editor: Satinder P. Gill, CMS Faculty of Music, University of Cambridge, UK
 Student Forum Editor: Larry Stapleton, INSYTE, Waterford Institute of Technology

Topics covered
 artificial intelligence
 robotics
 computer science
 engineering economics
 Man-Machine Symbiosis
 Mechatronics
 Performing Arts
 Methodological approaches in the social sciences.

References

External links 
 

English-language journals
Computer science journals
Quarterly journals
Publications established in 1987